Jason Quinn may refer to:
 Jason Quinn (accountant), South African accountant and corporate executive
Jason Quinn (chef), active in Orange County, California
 Quinn brothers' killings